After Dark Films is an American independent film production and distribution company founded by Courtney Solomon and Allan Zeman in 2006.

History

The company is the organizer for the annual independent horror film festival After Dark Horrorfest, also known as 8 Films to Die For. On March 30, 2010 the company founded After Dark Originals alongside Lionsgate and Syfy. On March 2, 2012, After Dark Films announced After Dark Action, an action film series.

Filmography

After Dark Horrorfest

After Dark Originals

After Dark Action

Other produced films

References

External links
After Dark Films
After Dark Originals
After Dark Action

Film production companies of the United States
American independent film studios